A breviograph or brevigraph (from , short, and Greek grapho, to write) is a type of scribal abbreviation in the form of an easily written symbol, character, flourish or stroke, based on a modified letter form to take the place of a common letter combination, especially those occurring at the beginning or end of a word. Breviographs were used frequently by stenographers, law clerks and scriveners, and they were also found in early printed books and tracts. Their use declined after the 17th century.

Examples
Examples of breviographs:

 & — et (e.g. &c = etc)
 ⋅i⋅  — id est
 ꝑ — per-, pre-, or par- (e.g. ꝑson = person)
 ß — ser-, sur-, or sir- (e.g. ßuaunt = seruaunt = servant)
 X — Christ- (e.g. Xian = Christian)

See also
  
 Acronym and initialism
 Palaeography
 Tironian notes
 Classical abbreviations
 Medieval abbreviations
 Scribal abbreviations

References

Sources 
 Elaine E. Whitaker, "Lacunae and the id est Brevigraph in Oxford, Bodleian Library, MS Bodley 283," Manuscripta 36, no. 3 (1992), 191–99.

Palaeography
Abbreviations
Scribes
Orthography